Adolf Nilsen (3 March 1895 – October 1983) was a Norwegian-American rower who competed in the 1920 Summer Olympics.

Adolf Gustinius Nilsen was born in Stavanger, Norway.  He was affiliated with the Stavanger Roklub, in Stavanger. In 1920 he won the bronze medal as crew member of the Norwegian boat in the eight competition. Nilsen was a rower on that Norwegian boat, which won the bronze medal behind the US and the UK.

He died in 1983 in Westminster, Colorado.

References

External links
 
 

1895 births
1983 deaths
Norwegian male rowers
Olympic rowers of Norway
Rowers at the 1920 Summer Olympics
Olympic bronze medalists for Norway
Sportspeople from Stavanger
Norwegian emigrants to the United States
Olympic medalists in rowing
Medalists at the 1920 Summer Olympics